The Cave of Swimmers is a cave with ancient rock art in the mountainous Gilf Kebir plateau of the Libyan Desert section of the Sahara. It is located in the New Valley Governorate of southwest Egypt, near the border with Libya.

History
The cave and rock art was discovered in October 1933 by the Hungarian explorer László Almásy. It contains Neolithic pictographs (rock painting images) and is named due to the depictions of people with their limbs bent as if they were swimming. The drawings include those of giraffe and hippopotamus. They are estimated to have been created as early as 10,000 years ago with the beginning of the African Humid Period, when the Sahara was significantly greener and wetter than it is today. The cause of the climate change 10,000 years ago was due to changes in summer solar insolation and vegetation and dust feedbacks.

Almásy devoted a chapter to the cave in his 1934 book, The Unknown Sahara. In it he postulates that the swimming scenes are real depictions of life at the time of painting and that the artists had realistically drawn their surroundings and that there had been a climatic change from temperate to xeric desert since that time making it drier. This theory was so new at that time that his first editor added several footnotes, to make it clear that he did not share this opinion.  In 2007, Eman Ghoneim discovered an ancient mega-lake (30,750 km²) buried beneath the sand of the Great Sahara in the Northern Darfur region, Sudan.

The cave is mentioned in Michael Ondaatje's novel The English Patient. The film adaptation has a scene in it that has a guide describing in his native language to Almásy, who is portrayed as a character in both the novel and the film, the location that Almásy renders a drawing and includes some text that is then placed in the book that he keeps for himself. The cave shown in the film is not the original but a film set created by a contemporary artist.

Present day
Physical scientists who have been conducting research in the area drew a provisional link between the proposed swimming humans and two lakes that are 124 miles (or 200 km) south of the cave. However, Andras Zboray, an archaeologist who is doing research in the area, questions whether the figures are swimming or not. He believes that the drawings are "clearly symbolic...with an unknown meaning."

Other researchers such as German ethnologist Hans Rhotert, who was involved in rock art research in North Africa and the Middle East, was the first to interpret these drawings as being that of deceased people. Jean-Loïc Le Quellec, a doctor of anthropology, ethnology and prehistory, agrees with Rhotert. He has pointed out parallels to the Coffin Texts indicating that the figures are deceased souls floating in the waters of Nun.

Due to similar artwork being found in nearby caves, such as the Cave of Beasts, and the continuous line that the figures create extending across a majority of the cave's interior has led researchers to believe that the cave art may display developing concepts that were later adapted to the configuration of the Nile valley.

Substantial portions of the cave have been irreversibly damaged by visitors over the years, especially since the film was released in 1996. Fragments of the paintings have been removed as souvenirs and some surfaces have cracked after water was applied to 'enhance' their contrast for photographs. Modern graffiti have been inscribed upon the wall and tourist littering is a problem.

Steps have been taken to reduce future damage by training guides and clearing litter from the vicinity, but this important rock art site remains fragile and risks future disturbances as tourist traffic to the region increases.

References

 László Almásy (1934): The Unknown Sahara. Translation of the Hungarian original Az Ismeretlen Szahara, 2002, by  Andras Zboray
 Ladislaus E. Almasy (1998): Schwimmer in der Wüste. Auf der Suche nach der Oase Zarzura. DTV, München,

External links

 The Cave of Swimmers Egyptian caves. Accessed March 2008
 Cosmos magazine People followed the rains in ancient Sahara Friday, 21 July 2006 by Marie Theresa Bray. Accessed March 2008
 https://skfb.ly/UBOS 3D model

Caves of Egypt
Archaeological sites in Egypt
Saharan rock art
Caves containing pictograms
New Valley Governorate
1933 archaeological discoveries